The  is the 36th edition of the Japan Academy Film Prize, an award presented by the Nippon Academy-Sho Association to award excellence in filmmaking. It awarded the best films of 2012 and it took place on March 8, 2013 at the Grand Prince Hotel New Takanawa in Tokyo, Japan.

Nominees

Awards

References

External links 
 36th Japan Academy Film Prize official website - 

Japan Academy Film Prize
2013 in Japanese cinema
Japan Academy Film Prize
March 2013 events in Japan